Helene Fischer (/heˈleːnə ˈfɪʃɚ/; German: [heˈleːnə ˈfɪʃɐ]; 5 August 1984) is a Russian-born German singer. Since her debut in 2005, she has won numerous awards, including 17 Echo awards, four "Die Krone der Volksmusik" awards and three Bambi awards. She has sold at least 15 million records. In June 2014, her multi-platinum 2013 album Farbenspiel became the most downloaded album ever by a German artist and is currently the sixth bestselling album of all time in Germany. Her signature song "Atemlos durch die Nacht" was the bestselling song in Germany in 2014. She has had the best-selling album of the year in Germany five times, in 2013, 2014, 2015, 2017, and 2018. She ranked No. 8 on Forbes' list of "The World's Highest-Paid Women In Music 2018", earning $US32 million. Fischer has been referred to as the "Queen of Schlager".

Early life
Helene Fischer was born in the Siberian city of Krasnoyarsk, Russian SFSR, Soviet Union, to Pyotr and Marina Fischer. Her father worked as a physical education teacher and her mother as an engineer. Her paternal grandparents were Black Sea Germans who were among those sent to forced settlements in Kazakhstan and Siberia. In 1988, at the age of three-and-a-half, she emigrated with her parents and her six-year older sister to Wöllstein, West Germany.

After graduating from high school, Fischer attended the Frankfurt Stage & Musical School for three years, where she studied singing and acting. During this time, she performed on stage at the Staatstheater Darmstadt, as well as on the stage of the Volkstheater Frankfurt.

Career

During her time at the Stage & Musical School, Fischer's mother secretly copied a demo CD with six of Fischer's songs and sent it to different recording studios to gauge the reaction of professionals.

Fischer's debut on stage took place on 14 May 2005, in a programme by the TV channel ARD. It was a duet with the singer Florian Silbereisen. The two later became a couple.

She has won 17 Echo awards, the "Goldene Henne" award seven times, and the "Krone der Volksmusik" prize four times. All her albums and DVDs have achieved multiple gold and double platinum status. Her songs, with their stories of the everyday worries and woes of home-loving folks, are lyrically close to what could be called "country music" although musically quite different.

Her fanbase extends beyond Germany, Austria and Switzerland to Belgium, Canada, the Netherlands, Denmark, Norway, the United Kingdom, Finland, the United States, and New Zealand.

She released her first English album, The English Ones, on 7 June 2010. On singing in English, Fischer commented: "I have always dreamed of singing my songs in another language. English is the language of Country, the music that we call 'Schlager'. Language is a tool, but it is important that what you sing comes from the heart – and that is what this album is about."

In January 2013, she made her acting debut in an episode of the German TV series Das Traumschiff.

On 4 October 2013, she released her album Farbenspiel in Germany. She went on tour in 2014 and a big stadium tour in 2015. She played in the Olympia Stadium in Berlin in front of 120,000 people. The album received platinum after five days in Germany, Denmark and Austria. Farbenspiel is the most successful release of a German female artist in the first week of release in the last 10 years. To date, over 2.4 million copies of the album have been sold.

On 13 November 2015, Fischer released a Christmas album entitled Weihnachten. It consists of two CDs, the first being Christmas songs sung in German and German dialects, and the second is songs sung in English. The album reached number 1 of the year-end charts in both Germany and Austria and received altogether 14 platinums in both countries. It sold over 1.3 million copies.

In 2016, she sang the German version of "How Far I'll Go" (Ich bin bereit), the title song of Disney's Moana.

On 12 May 2017, she released her eighth studio album, which bears her own name of Helene Fischer. It was released by Polydor. The album debuted at number one on the Austrian, German, and Swiss Albums Chart and reached the top ten in the Netherlands and the Flemish region of Belgium. In Germany, Helene Fischer sold more than 300,000 copies in its first week of release, making it the highest-selling debut since Herbert Grönemeyer's 2002 album Mensch. It won nine platinums in Germany and Austria and has sold over 1 million copies in both countries to date. She performed all her new songs and several hits from previous albums in the Kesselhaus, Munich and released the album Helene Fischer – Das Konzert aus dem Kesselhaus showcasing this performance. In June 2018, she started her second stadium tour, performing in Germany, Switzerland, Netherlands, and Austria. In several locations on this tour, she performed up to five times in a row. Her show was developed together with 45 Degrees of Cirque du Soleil. In October 2018, The New York Times ranked Fischer seventh in terms of the world's biggest touring musician acts of the year. In the 2018 Forbes list of top-earning female artists worldwide, she ranked 8th. This also makes her currently the most successful non-English singer.

Die Helene Fischer Show
Fischer hosts the yearly music entertainment show , which is broadcast during Christmas on German public TV. In this show, she has performed with various artists, including David Garrett, Michael Bolton, Tom Jones, Max Raabe, Take That, Udo Jürgens, Olly Murs, Andrea Berg, Bryan Adams, Unheilig, Kiefer Sutherland, Freya Ridings, Nick Carter and Queen. She accompanied Lindsey Stirling with an acrobatic performance.

Discography

 Von hier bis unendlich (2006)
 So nah wie du (2007)
 Zaubermond (2008)
 So wie ich bin (2009)
 Für einen Tag (2011)
 Farbenspiel (2013)
 Weihnachten (2015)
 Helene Fischer (2017)
 Rausch (2021)

Guest appearances and duets
 Eros Ramazzotti: Vita ce n'è – "Per il resto tutto bene" (2018)
 Andrea Bocelli: Passione – "When I Fall in Love" (2013)
 Michael Bolton: Various duets, e.g. "Make You Feel My Love", "Vivo Per Lei"
 Robbie Williams: The Christmas Present – "Santa Baby" (2019) 
 Just Pretend by Elvis Presley and Helene Fischer ft Royal Philharmonic Orchestra.

Tours
 Mut zum Gefühl – Live 2008 (2008)
 Zum ersten Mal mit Band und Orchester Live (2011)
 Für einen Tag Live (2012)
 Open Air-Tour 2013 (2013)
 Farbenspiel Live (2014/2015)
 Helene Fischer Live 2017/2018 (2017/2018)
 Die Stadion-Tour 2018 (2018)

Awards 

Bambi
 2013: for Musik national
 2014: for Entertainment
 2017: for Musik National

Echo
 2009: for Deutschsprachiger Schlager
 2009: for DVD Produktion des Jahres (Mut zum Gefühl Live)
 2010: for DVD Produktion national (Zaubermond Live)
 2012: for Deutschsprachiger Schlager
 2013: for DVD Produktion national (Für einen Tag – Live 2012)
 2013: for Deutschsprachiger Schlager
 2014: for Album des Jahres
 2014: for Deutschsprachiger Schlager
 2015: for Schlager
 2015: for Album des Jahres
 2015: for Hit des Jahres
 2015: for Musik-DVD/Blu-Ray national
 2016: for Musik-DVD/Blu-Ray national (Weihnachten), (Farbenspiel Live)
 2016: for Album des Jahres
 2016: for Live-Act National
 2016: for Crossover
 2018: for Schlager

Goldene Henne
 2007: for Aufsteigerin des Jahres
 2008: for Musik
 2010: for Leserpreis Musik
 2012: for Publikumspreis Musik
 2014: for Musik
 2014: Superhenne (Special 20th Anniversary Award)
 2016: for Musik
 2020: for Entertainment with Die Helene Fischer Show 2019

Goldene Kamera
 2012: for Beste Musik national
 2016: for Beliebtester deutscher Musik-Act

Krone der Volksmusik
See: Krone der Volksmusik
 2008: for the Erfolg des Jahres 2007 2009: for the Erfolg des Jahres 2008 2010: as Erfolgreichste Sängerin 2009 2012: as Erfolgreichste Sängerin 2011Romy
 2014: as Beliebteste Moderatorin – ShowWorld Music Awards
 2014: Best-selling German Artist''

References

External links

 Official website (in German)
 

1984 births
Living people
People from Alzey-Worms
German female dancers
German television presenters
German actresses
Russian and Soviet-German people
Soviet emigrants to Germany
Echo (music award) winners
Schlager musicians
Volga German people
21st-century German women singers
German women television presenters
Citizens of Germany through descent